No Strange was an Italian rock group influenced by psychedelic music that combined elements of rock and cosmic music. It was formed in Turin in 1980 by Salvatore Ursus D'Urso and Alberto Ezzu.

Discography

Demo Tapes

Albums

Singles

CDs

Albums Compilation

CDs Compilation

Side project

Alberto Ezzu Lux Vocal Ensemble

AlmaMantra

Alberto Ezzu

Alberto Ezzu Lux Vocal Ensemble

It was psychedelia in the beginning. Since the 1970s Ezzu has been following the same dream, the dream of his own generation to expand the borders of the mind. Through the years he has never given up that quest, even though things have changed and today he can say with Socrates "know yourself". He has consistently followed his path going through all kind of music and sound experiences. "No Strange" experience was "something absolutely original"  and it stood apart in the Neo psychedelic Italian scene whose interest was in the sound but also in the hair-cut and clothes of British and American bands of the 1960s and 1970s. No Strange benchmarks included the first Pink Floyd, Brainticket, Soft Machine and Third Ear Band but mainly the early works of Tangerine Dream and Popol Vuh, with whom they shared a common musical and spiritual quest. Twenty years later this new Ezzu project is inspired by the same love for sound, for the winding paths of thought, for the possibility of human mind. His way has changed because his life and his work have changed. After years of Zen meditation he has dedicated himself to music therapy and became a professional therapist. The Benenzon Model and its concept of helping relation has given the possibility to compare his mind, his thoughts and feelings with the mind, the thoughts and feelings of other people –being them patients or colleagues- and to constantly check himself and his progress in a sound filled environment.  
"Consonanze Armoniche, Ostinati Ritmici e Veri Bordoni Immobili» lives in the stream of popular and learned drone music and of avant-garde music which gets its inspiration into American Minimalism of authors like La Monte Young and Terry Riley, and also Alvin Curran and the duo Cuni-Durand which is particularly influential for Ezzu who studied Dhrupad singing with Amelia Cuni. The study of multi-note singing –whose tradition origins in Siberia Mongolia and Tibet- completes Ezzu's technical background and gives to his style a personal and unique sound.
In this work as in his previous "Il Fuoco del 6° Armonico sulla Luce della Dominante partendo dalla Madre Fondamentale – con in mente Zarathustra" (performed live but still not released) the sound is both avant-garde and ancient, primeval as if generated by the early wave motion of the Big Bang.
The synphonia (a forefather of hurdy-gurdy with wheel stricken strings) played by Ezzu, the bass viola da gamba and the lute played by Raffaela Gottardelli e Guido Montegrandi in two out of four compositions in the CD, create a modal frame in which the solo singers weave delicate sound textures like slow spirals of incense smoke fading in the air. The first track, an Indian harmonium solo, and the final vocal duo with the Sicilian Maestro Raffaele Schiavo introduce and reshape the modal core stating and twisting it into an intangible –but dense and physical- intimacy. Music seems to graze an inner landscape of a deep and unsaid land. Maestri of harmonic singing like Marco Garri (a David Hykes student), Alberto Guccione (author of the CD-book Canto Armonico, Red Edizioni), and  Raffaele Schiavo alternate short melodies to the long drones of the harmonic choir performed by Marco Buccolo (musicologist and composer), Pino Poclen, Rosella Lancina e Massimo Amelio the original members and backbone of the Ensemble.
A recording out of time, suspended in a slow and almost unreal but constant flowing. The first hundred copies, numbered and signed by Ezzu himself are wrapped into fabric folders made by the quilt maker Raffaella Gottardelli – they will probably become collectors item as it is the first record by No Strange (transparent vinyl with a transparent and coloured cover) -.
The Centro Musicoterapia Benenzon Italia presents this recording as part of its editorial policy. Together with the book Introduzione alla Musicoterapia by Ezzu - Messaglia, the proceedings of the II Convegno Internazionale "Musica tra Neuroscienze, Arte e Terapia", the CD by Alberto Ezzu Lux Vocal and Instrumental Ensemble testifies the work done by the Centro in the teaching of multi-note singing to music therapist but also to musician and people who are interested into this technique.

Notes and references

External links 
 Toast Records
 Alberto Ezzu site
 Psychout Records
 areapirata Records
 Interview at Indiepop
 http://www.aliodie.com/index.php?_w=1&__fidSez=3&cnt= (Hic Sunt Leones Label)
 http://www.artecuratrasformazione.net

Italian psychedelic rock music groups
Italian rock music groups
Musical groups established in 1986
Musical groups disestablished in 1992
1986 establishments in Italy